Salomón Jara Cruz (born 15 September 1959) is a Mexican politician affiliated with National Regeneration Movement and serving as a senator in the LXIV Legislature of the Mexican Congress from the state of Oaxaca. Under the PRD, he had previously been a senator of the LX and LXI Legislatures. He also served as Deputy between 1991 and 1994. He is the current Governor of Oaxaca.

References

1959 births
Living people
Politicians from Oaxaca
Members of the Senate of the Republic (Mexico)
Members of the Chamber of Deputies (Mexico)
Morena (political party) politicians
Party of the Democratic Revolution politicians
20th-century Mexican politicians
21st-century Mexican politicians
Members of the Congress of Oaxaca
Senators of the LXIV and LXV Legislatures of Mexico
Governors of Oaxaca